(Hail Mary), WAB 5, is a setting of the Latin prayer Ave Maria by Anton Bruckner.

History 

Bruckner composed this motet on 24 July 1856, five years before his more famous motet, as a present for the name-day of Ignaz Traumihler, choirmaster of St. Florian Abbey. The first performance occurred on 7 October 1856 for the Rosenkranzfest (Feast of the Holy Rosary) in Sankt Florian.

The original manuscript is lost, but the score dedicated to Traumihler is stored in the archive of the St. Florian Abbey. Copies are also stored in the Kremsmünster Abbey and the Österreichische Nationalbibliothek. The motet was edited first by Johann Groß, Innsbruck in 1893.

Music 

The 52-bar long motet in F major is scored  choir and  soloists, organ and cello (continuo). It begins in Andante with a fugato. The fugato is ending on bar 8 with the by Haas so-called Marien-Kadenz (cadence on the word "Maria"), which Bruckner will recall in the first movement of the Study Symphony in F minor and in the Adagio of the later Symphony No. 3. On the next bar the alto soloist is singing "gratia plena" and on bar 13 the soprano soloist is going on with "benedicta tu". On bars 18-22 the score is slowing down to Adagio, during which the choir is singing three times "Jesus". Bruckner will repeat this three times "Jesus" in his next two settings of the Ave Maria. The second part of the motet is sung by the choir (bars 23-52). The score, which goes back to Andante, begins with "Sancta Maria", sung in canon and ends with the beginning motif.

Selected discography 
The first recording of Bruckner's Ave Maria (WAB 5) was by Hubert Gunther with the Rheinische Singgemeinschaft in c. 1976 (LP: Garnet G 40 107). Farnberger's recording with the St. Florianer Sängerknaben, which was recorded in the St. Florian Abbey, provides the listener with a whiff of authenticity.

A selection of the about 10 recordings:
 Martin Flämig, Dresdner Kreuzchor, Ave Maria – Anton Bruckner: Geistliche Chöre-Motets – CD: Capriccio 10 081, 1985
 Joseph Pancik, Prager Kammerchor, Anton Bruckner: Motetten / Choral-Messe – CD: Orfeo C 327 951 A, 1993
 Sigvards Klava, Latvian Radio Choir, Musica Sacra – CD: Campion Records RRCD 1341, 1996
 Franz Farnberger, St. Florianer Sängerknaben, Anton Bruckner in St. Florian – Requiem & Motetten CD: Studio SM D2639 SM 44, 1997
 Dan-Olof Stenlund, Malmö Kammarkör, Bruckner: Ausgewählte Werke - CD: Malmö Kammarkör MKKCD 051, 2004
 Petr Fiala, Czech Philharmonic Choir, Anton Bruckner: Motets - CD: MDG 322 1422-2, 2006 
 Erwin Ortner, Arnold Schoenberg Chor, Anton Bruckner: Tantum ergo - CD: ASC Edition 3, issue of the choir, 2008

Note 
The recordings are mostly performed without cello. The score of the soloists is sometimes sung by the mating voices of choir.

References

Sources 
 Max Auer, Anton Bruckner als Kirchenmusiker, G. Bosse, Regensburg, 1927
 Anton Bruckner - Sämtliche Werke, Band XXI: Kleine Kirchenmusikwerke, Musikwissenschaftlicher Verlag der Internationalen Bruckner-Gesellschaft, Hans Bauernfeind and Leopold Nowak (Editor), Vienna, 1984/2001
 Cornelis van Zwol, Anton Bruckner 1824-1896 - Leven en werken, uitg. Thoth, Bussum, Netherlands, 2012.

External links 
 
 http://www.abruckner.com/vocal_instrumental_music/php/index.php@pag=144.htm Ave Maria F-Dur, WAB 5 (1856)] Critical discography by Hans Roelofs 
 The following live performances can be heard on YouTube:
 Fernando Rubio Rodríguez (2008): Ave Maria, WAB 5
 The Kyoto boys' choir (2014): Ave Maria, WAB 5

1856 compositions
Motets by Anton Bruckner
Compositions in F major